"Walkin' on the Moon" is the third single by The-Dream from his second album Love vs. Money. The song features rapper Kanye West.

Critical reception
Billboard magazine gave the song a positive review, saying: "The third single from the-Dream's critically acclaimed album "Love vs. Money" finds the R&B artist tipping his hat to Michael Jackson, in a futuristic way. Kicking into a techno beat, the-Dream crafts a melodic pop tune that manages to fit nicely into the current uptempo R&B trend, while creating some new sonics of its own. With MJ-imitated "woo-hoo's"; a clever, flirtatious rap interlude from Kanye West; and romantic lyrics throughout, this could be the summer anthem for young lovers everywhere".

Music video
The video was premiered on May 20, 2009 at a Def Jam event. On May 27, 2009, the video was premiered on 106 & Park. The video was directed by Hype Williams. The video doubles as a homage to Michael Jackson and Janet Jackson's hit 1995 music video, "Scream".

The video ranked at #71 on BET's Notarized: Top 100 Videos of 2009 countdown.

Charts

References

2009 singles
The-Dream songs
Kanye West songs
Music videos directed by Hype Williams
Songs written by Kanye West
Songs written by The-Dream
2009 songs
Def Jam Recordings singles